Colin Arthur Still ARAIA (13 March 19437 August 2017), was an Australian architect from Watsons Bay, Sydney. As part of his involvement with the ARAIA he was Vice President and Chair of the Environment committee. He was also an active artist, and finalist in several Wynne Prize landscape competitions.

Career 
 1961 Trainee in Government Architects Branch NSW DPWS
 Architect NSW Department of Public Works
 To 1994	Assistant Government Architect, NSW Department of Public Works			
 1994 -2003 Director Cox Architects 
 2003-2017 Still Design

Notable projects 
 1967 	Parramatta Central Boiler House
 1973 	State Brickworks, Blacktown
 1973 	Grafton Police Station & Court House Restoration	
 1973–1975 Still House, 8 Victoria Street, Watsons Bay (Colin & Irene Still Architects)
 1975 	Rodgers House, 174 Queen Street Woollahra (Colin & Irene Still Architects)
 1981 	St George Institute of Education (SGIE) UNSW 
 1982	Armidale Civic Centre, Armidale
 1978–1980 Oatley Senior Campus, Former Alexander Mackie College of Advanced Education 
 1984 	State Sports Centre, Homebush
 Australian Museum Extensions 
 Orange Regional Library & Art Gallery Orange 
 Flemington Markets
 NSW Government Stores, Wetherill Park
 CSIRO Research Laboratories, ANSTO Lucas Heights
 Lizard Island Research Station
 Taronga Zoo Aquatic Centre Proposal, Sydney
 National Naval Aviation Museum, Nowra
 University of Western Sydney, Campus Masterplan
 Newington Business Park, Olympic Park Village
 NERAM, Armidale
 Still House, Seal Rocks, NSW
 2001	Lake Macquarie City Art Gallery 
 2008	Lake Macquarie City Art Gallery Seminar Art Room additions
 Coffs Harbour (Henry Kendall)  Arts Centre, Coffs Harbour RAIA award for unrealised projects
 High Density Residential, Riverside, Singapore Towers
 Research Laboratories, CSIRO, ANSTO Lucas Heights, Lizard Island Research Station
 Observatory Hotel, Cronulla Resort
 Stadiums in China, Korea, Malaysia
 Exhibition and convention centres: Sydney and China
 Sydney Game Fishing Club, Watsons Bay Wharf

Buildings on the RAIA NSW Register of Twentieth Century Buildings of Significance
 1973-5 Still House, 8 Victoria Street, Watsons Bay (C & I Still Architects)
 1978-80 Oatley Senior Campus, Former Alexander Mackie College of Advanced Education 
 1986	Orange Regional Library & Art Gallery Orange

Awards 
 1966 RAIA Silver Medal as the Outstanding student of architecture for the year
 RAIA Merit Award Category A 1973 State Brickworks, Blacktown
 RAIA 1973 "Sisalkraft' Scholarship 
 RAIA Merit Award Category B 1976 Still House, 8 Victoria Street, Watsons Bay
 RAIA Merit Award Category B House, 174 Queen Street, Woollahra
 RAIA Merit Award Sydney Olympic Park State Sports Centre, Sarah Durack Avenue, Homebush Bay, Auburn
 RAIA Merit Award 1981 Alexander Mackie College of Advanced Education
 RAIA Sir John Sulman Medal 1986 Orange Regional Library & Art Gallery Orange 
 RAIA Blacket Award Commendation 1986 Orange Regional Library & Art Gallery, Orange
 AIA Dangar Award

Death 
Colin died at home in Watsons Bay on 7 August, aged 74, after a protracted battle against Prostate Cancer. His funeral with a congregation overflowing into the garden was held at St Peter’s Church, Watsons Bay. His life was then celebrated at a wake at the Watsons Bay Game Fishing Club attended by friends and architectural colleagues – including many young architects who he mentored.
Colin was survived by his widow Irene, a skilled architect and illustrator in her own right, as well as children Ben and
Nina, and four grandchildren.

References 

1943 births

2017 deaths

20th-century Australian architects

People educated at Newington College